Thomas Joseph Lonergan (born 28 December 1964) and Eileen Cassidy Lonergan (née Hains; born 3 March 1969) were a married American couple who were unintentionally abandoned in the Coral Sea off Australia's northeast coast on 25 January 1998, during a group scuba diving trip on MV Outer Edge. Their absences were not noted by the boat crew until two days later on 27 January and while search efforts resulted in the discovery of personal effects presumed to be those of the Lonergans, they did not lead to their discovery. Their whereabouts are unknown, though both are presumed dead.

The couple's disappearance and deaths resulted in "a crisis of confidence in north Queensland's dive industry" and resulted in tighter mandatory safety regulations for diving boats in Australia. Their disappearances also served as the inspiration for the 2003 film Open Water.

Background
Thomas Joseph Lonergan and Eileen Hains, both graduates of Louisiana State University, were married in Jefferson, Texas on 24 June 1988.

Disappearance
On 25 January 1998, the Lonergans were scuba diving with a group at St. Crispin's Reef in Australia's Great Barrier Reef. The boat transporting the group to the dive site departed before the Lonergans returned from the water. None of the vessel's crew or passengers noticed the two had not come back aboard.

At the time of the incident, the couple had recently completed a two-year tour of duty with the Peace Corps at Funafuti atoll in the small South Pacific island nation of Tuvalu and were repeating that work in Fiji.

Investigations and trial
The couple were not discovered missing until two days later, on 27 January 1998, after a bag containing their belongings was found on board the dive boat. A massive air and sea search took place over the following three days.

In February 1998, a women's wetsuit matching Eileen's size washed ashore in north Queensland. Upon examination of barnacle growth on the wetsuit, it was determined it had likely been submerged in the ocean since January. It also bore tears along buttock and armpit area, presumed by examiners to have resulted from coming in contact with coral.

Several theories were suggested surrounding their disappearance. At the time, it was suggested that the Lonergans might have staged their disappearance. However, the Lonergans' bank accounts were never touched and their insurance policies were not claimed.

Excerpts from Tom's personal diary were found portraying a man who was looking for a "quick and peaceful" death. Eileen's writings expressed that she had chosen to stay with Tom, no matter the outcome. However, the diary entries were taken out of context, according to Eileen's parents and family members. The family, the coroner Noel Nunan, and the Port Douglas police claim that only the pages that would validate the suicide theory were leaked to the press, whereas the majority of the diaries remain unread except by the coroner, Port Douglas police, and the Hains family.

Among these items were inflatable dive jackets marked with the Lonergans' names, along with their compressed air tanks and one of Eileen's fins. Also recovered was a weathered diver's slate (a device used for communicating underwater) which reportedly read: "Monday Jan 26; 1998 08am. To anyone who can help us: We have been abandoned on A[gin]court Reef by MV Outer Edge 25 Jan 1998 3pm. Please help to rescue us before we die. Help!!!"

Eileen's father, John Hains, later said that he suspects the couple ultimately became dehydrated and disoriented and in the end succumbed to drowning or sharks. During the inquest on the deaths, experts speculated that, based on the state of the gear recovered, the couple had not likely experienced an animal attack, but rather succumbed to delirium resulting from dehydration, which caused them to voluntarily remove their diving outfits. Without the buoyancy provided by their gear, experts testified the couple would have been unable to tread water for long, and would have soon drowned.

The coroner dismissed suggestions that the Lonergans had either died by suicide or faked their own disappearance, and formally charged Geoffrey Ian "Jack" Nairn, skipper of the dive boat, with their unlawful killing. He was later found not guilty, but his company, Outer Edge Dive, was fined after pleading guilty to negligence and went out of business. Queensland's government also introduced stiffer regulations, among which was the requirement that captains and dive masters independently confirm each head count.

Media
The 2003 movie Open Water was inspired by the Lonergans' disappearance. The film is set in the Caribbean and shows two divers getting left at sea due to an incorrect headcount.

See also
List of people who disappeared mysteriously at sea
Open Water

References

External links
Undercurrent: "Two Divers Left at Sea - Did the Headcount Fail?" .(Adobe Acrobat PDF document) at undercurrent.org
Returned Peace Corps Volunteers (RPCVs) Tom and Eileen Lonergan at peacecorpsonline.org
13/1/2000 Diver's disappearance renews talk on safety regulations at abc.net.au

1964 births
1969 births
1990s missing person cases
1998 deaths
1998 in Australia
Accidental deaths in Queensland
Deaths by person in Australia
Great Barrier Reef
History of Queensland
Married couples
Missing person cases in Australia
Peace Corps volunteers
People from Baton Rouge, Louisiana
People lost at sea